Dòmhnall MacAmhlaigh (21 May 1930 – 28 February 2017) was a Scottish Gaelic poet and professor.

Early life

He was born and raised in a Gaelic-speaking community on Great Bernera, near the Isle of Lewis, and excelled in his secondary studies at the Nicholson Institute. He got first class honors in his degree in Celtic and English at the University of Aberdeen. While MacAmhlaigh did National Service in the Royal Navy between 1955 and 1958, he learned Russian and spent time in Turkey. He married Ella Sangster (of  Rothiemay, Moray) in January 1957 and had two children and five grandchildren.

Academic career

He began to work for the university of Edinburgh in 1958, teaching first in English and Linguistics, later the Celtic Studies Department. He also taught at Trinity College, Dublin, at Aberdeen University, and at the Glasgow University where he retired in 1996.

Style
His first book of Gaelic poetry, Seobhrach às a' chlaich ("Primrose out of the rock"), was published in 1967. He edited the landmark collection of twentieth-century Gaelic poetry, Nua-bàrdachd Gàidhlig, which was published in 1977.
As with other Scottish Gaelic poets, MacAmhlaigh made English verse translations of his own work. "However, other MacAulay poems remain untranslated and to an extent untranslatable, since, influenced perhaps by e. e. cummings, he was intrigued by the word-play specific to a particular language. Undeterred by readership, his work upholds the integrity of the poet to speak out..."

Bibliography

Gaelic

English

References

External links
JSTOR academic paper about his work
Biography of MacAmhlaigh at Comhairle nan Leabhraichean (Scottish Gaelic)
Biography of MacAmhlaigh at the BBC's Làrach nam Bàrd (Scottish Gaelic)
Obituary from Herald Scotland
MacAmhlaigh talks about the 1900 British election (Scottish Gaelic)
MacAmhlaigh talks about the conflict between people from eastern and western Lewis (Scottish Gaelic)

20th-century Scottish Gaelic poets
Celtic studies
Academics of the University of Glasgow
1930 births
2017 deaths